Moev is an electronic band based in Vancouver, British Columbia that recorded on Atlantic Records, Nettwerk Records, Go! Records and Cop International.

History
Moev was formed in 1981 by Tom Ferris and Cal Stephenson. The band released an EP in 1982, and later that year the electro/techno pop album Zimmerkampf.
In an interview with Dean Russell at Lee's Palace back in the early 80's he explained what the name of the band meant. 
He Stated that " Mauve - M.A.U.V.E is a pretty purplish pink, and Moev - M.O.E.V. is the colour of insanity"

Stephenson, along with early members Mark Jowett and Michela Arichiello, left the band before the recording of its best-known album Yeah Whatever in 1988. Kelly Cook, Anthony Valcic and Dean Russell contributed to the album, which combined dark, solemn, anthemic lyrics with disjointed beats, trickling electronics, and occasional spoken-word samples.  Singles from the album include "Yeah Whatever", "Wanting", and "Crucify Me", the only lyrics to which are "Why would you / Crucify me?" (Other than isolated spoken-word samples "Properly sedated", "Take four red capsules, help is on the way" and "For the masses", which are all taken from George Lucas' 1971 film THX 1138.)  "Crucify Me" rose to number 4 in Rolling Stone magazine's Top Dance Tracks.

Over the band's lifetime, other members included Madelaine Morris, Julie Ferris and Drew Maxwell. In conjunction with Terry McBride, Jowett formed the record label Nettwerk to release the band's albums.

Sarah McLachlan sang backup on a few tracks on the Head Down album, including the tracks "Head Down", "In & Out", and "Noise".

Dean Russell died in 1994 of complications due to AIDS, and the band broke up.

Michela Arrichiello (vocals) died in 2011.

Tom and Julie Ferris reformed Moev in 1999.

In January 2007 the latest incarnation of Moev, Tom and Julie Ferris, released the single "A Thousand Lashes" from a forthcoming album Ventilation, which was released January 19, 2010 as a download only album.

Julie and Tom Ferris are also members of the Vancouver band Lazarazu with Kevin Kane of The Grapes of Wrath.

Discography

Albums
 Zimmerkampf (1982) GO! Records
 Dusk and Desire (1986) Nettwerk Records/Profile
 The Early Years (1987) CD Presents, LTD.
 Yeah, Whatever (1988) Atlantic Records/Nettwerk
 Head Down (1990) Atlantic Records/Nettwerk
 Obituary Column Ha (compilation) (1991) Nettwerk Records
 Suffer EP (1999) COP International
 Ventilation (2010) Carved Out Publishing
 One Minute World (2013) Carved Out Publishing

Singles
 "Cracked Mirror" (1981)
 "Rotting Geraniums" (1982)
 "In Your Head" (1982)
 "Toulyev" (1984)
 "Alibis" (1984)
 "Took Out The Lace" (1986)
 "Wanting" (1987)
 "Capital Heaven" (1988)
 "Yeah, Whatever" (1988)
 "Crucify Me" (1989)
 "Head Down" (1990)
 "In and Out" (1990)
 "Suffer" (1999)
 "Locked In A Box" (2011)

References

External links
 Moev Official Website
 Moev at MySpace

1981 establishments in British Columbia
Canadian synthpop groups
Musical groups established in 1981
Musical groups from Vancouver
Nettwerk Records artists
Canadian new wave musical groups